William Dixon West (27 January 1901 – 23 May 1994) was an English geologist who worked in India with the Geological Survey of India and was involved in establishing a department of applied geology at the Sagar University in Sagar Madhya Pradesh.

Biography
West was born in Bournemouth, the son of A.J. West who worked on railways in North Borneo. After growing up in Jesselton, North Borneo, he went to King's School, Canterbury where he excelled in football. He also became interested in geology and studied the subject at St John's College, Cambridge where a major influence was the petrologist Alfred Harker. He received a Winchester Prize in 1922 and joined the Geological Survey of India in 1923. He worked with Lewis L. Fermor in central India and then studied the Deolapar Nappe (in Sausar) which he discovered in 1936 and the Shali Window near Shimla. He worked along with G.E. Pilgrim and explored stratigraphy in the Himalayas which led to a DSc from Cambridge University in 1945. He took an interest in the 1935 Quetta earthquake and suggested that it was due to strain in the looped fold axis in the region. He was involved in surveys for coal and discovered the reserves in Dara-e-Suf in the Afghan Hindu-Kush. West became director of the Geological Survey of India in 1945 and held the position until Indian Independence when he returned to England. He was awarded the Lyell Medal by the Geological Society of London in 1951. He however returned to India in 1951 after an invitation from R.P. Tripathi, vice chancellor at Saugar University. He joined the university and organized a department of applied geology there, working in collaboration with manganese mining industry in the area. He retired from the University in 1977 but remained Professor Emeritus. He died in Bhopal. West noted the importance of  the Narmada-Son Lineament and that no Gondwana rocks lay to its north or Vindhyan rocks to its south but did not cite the earlier work of Joseph G. Medlicott for which West has been accused of plagiarism.

References 

1901 births
1994 deaths
Alumni of St John's College, Cambridge
English geologists
Lyell Medal winners